European Entrepreneurs CEA-PME (Confédération Européenne des Associations de Petites et Moyennes Entreprises) is the largest European confederation of voluntarily associated small and medium-sized enterprises (SMEs). It is a Brussels-based business federation which currently counts 25 European associations among its members, with more than 2.1 million enterprises, employing over 20 million people. It maintains relationships with 15 partner associations in Europe, the Americas, Africa, Asia, Australia and New Zealand.The Confederation's president is Maurizio Casasco, President of the Italian SME association CONFAPI, and the Co-President Mr. Markus Jerger, Executive Director of the Gerrman SME association BVMW.

European Entrepreneurs CEA-PME was founded in 1992 and was registered in Belgium in 2004. It represents the interests of its members towards the institutions of the European Union and offers its members services in the field of public relations.

The confederation regularly publishes positions on the most important European policies that have an impact on SMEs. It leads and has led a number of EU-funded projects to support SMEs across Europe like the first iteration of MobiliseSME, thought of as "an Erasmus for SMEs", DigitaliseSME, which helped entrepreneurs work with digital experts to digitalise their companies and the ongoing DataSkills4SMEs, which helps SMEs acquire data skills in different fields, like digital marketing and cybersecurity.

External links
Website
MobiliseSME (first iteration) 
DigitaliseSME
DataSkills4SMEs

Organizations related to the European Union
Business organizations based in Europe
Organizations related to small and medium-sized enterprises